Canterbury Tales: The Best of Caravan is the 1976 compilation album released by Caravan. It was expanded, repackaged and released in 1994.

Track listing 

Original release (1976)

The 1994 edition added tracks to make a 2 CD release..

Notes: "For Richard" is the shortened name of "Can't Be Long Now/Francoise/For Richard/Warlock". The track that appears on the 1976 release of Canterbury Tales was recorded at Fairfield Halls in 1974. The CD issue replaces this version with the two other previously released versions: the original studio recording from If I Could Do It All Over Again, I'd Do It All Over You (1970), and a live version from Caravan and the New Symphonia (1974).

Personnel 

 Pye Hastings – vocals, guitar
 Geoff Richardson – viola
 David Sinclair – keyboards
 Steve Miller – keyboards
 Richard Sinclair – bass
 John G. Perry – bass guitar, vocals, percussion
 Richard Coughlan – drums, percussion, timpani

Releases information

References

External links
 
 Caravan - Canterbury Tales: The Best of Caravan (1994) album review by Lindsay Planer, credits & releases at AllMusic.com
 
 Caravan - Canterbury Tales: The Best of Caravan (1994) album releases & credits at Discogs.com

Caravan (band) compilation albums
1973 greatest hits albums
Deram Records compilation albums